The George Washington International Law Review is a triannual student-run and -edited publication of the George Washington University Law School. It presents articles and essays on public and private international financial development, comparative law, and public international law and also publishes the Guide to International Legal Research annually.

Established in 1966 as the Journal of Law and Economic Development, later titles included Journal of International Law and Economics and George Washington Journal of International Law and Economics.

External links

International law journals
George Washington University Law School
Publications established in 1966
George Washington University